This is a list of the medalists of the open water swimming competitions at the World Aquatics Championships. Medalists at the FINA World Open Water Swimming Championships, which have been held as separate events in the even years between 2000 and 2010, have not been included.

Men
Bold numbers in brackets denotes record number of victories in corresponding disciplines.

5 km (1998–present)

Medals:

10 km (2001–present)

Medals:

25 km (1991–present)

Medals:

Women
Bold numbers in brackets denotes record number of victories in corresponding disciplines.

5 km (1998–present)

Medals:

10 km (2001–present)

Medals:

25 km (1991–present)

Medals:

Mixed team
Bold numbers in brackets denotes record number of victories in corresponding disciplines.

5 km (1998–2019), 6 km (2022)

Medals:

25 km (1998)

Medals:

All-time medal table 1991–2022
Updated after the 2022 World Aquatics Championships.

Multiple medalists
Boldface denotes active swimmers and highest medal count among all swimmers (including these who not included in these tables) per type.

Men

Men (including medals won in 2000–2010)
This table includes medals won at the separate FINA World Open Water Swimming Championships in 2000–2010.

Women

Women (including medals won in 2000–2010)
This table includes medals won at the separate FINA World Open Water Swimming Championships in 2000–2010.

See also
FINA World Open Water Swimming Championships
List of World Aquatics Championships medalists in swimming (men)
List of World Aquatics Championships medalists in swimming (women)

Lists of swimming medalists
Open water swimming at the World Aquatics Championships
open water swimming